Wesley Saïd (born 19 April 1995) is a French professional footballer who plays as a winger for Ligue 1 club RC Lens. He is a former France youth international, having represented his country from under-16 to under-21 level.

Club career

Rennes 
Born in Noisy-le-Grand, Saïd is a youth exponent of Rennes. He made his Ligue 1 debut at 31 August 2013 against Lille in a goalless draw at Stade de la Route de Lorient starting in the first eleven and was substituted for Jonathan Pitroipa after 73 minutes.

He was loaned to Laval for the 2014–15 season on the last day of the transfer window.

Saïd was loaned to Ligue 2 side Dijon for the 2015–16 season.

Dijon 
In July 2017, Saïd signed a four-year contract with Dijon. The transfer fee paid to Rennes was reported as €1.5 million with a possible €500,000 more in bonuses and a 20% sell-on clause.

Toulouse 
On 3 August 2019, Toulouse announced the signing of Saïd on a four-year deal.

Lens 
On 22 June 2021, Saïd signed a four-year contract with Ligue 1 club Lens. On 17 January 2023, he extended his contract with Lens until 2026.

International career
Born in France to a Réunionnais father (of Comorian descent) and a Mauritian mother, Saïd is a former France youth international.

Career statistics

References

External links
 
 

1995 births
Living people
People from Noisy-le-Grand
Footballers from Seine-Saint-Denis
French people of Mauritian descent
French people of Réunionnais descent
French sportspeople of Comorian descent
Association football forwards
French footballers
France under-21 international footballers
France youth international footballers
Stade Rennais F.C. players
Stade Lavallois players
Dijon FCO players
Toulouse FC players
RC Lens players
Championnat National 3 players
Ligue 1 players
Ligue 2 players
Black French sportspeople